Franz Stein (1880–1958) was a German cinematographer and film actor. During the silent era he shot a number of films, many of them for National Film. After 1925 his film appearances were exclusively as an actor.

Selected filmography

Cinematographer

 Lotte Lore (1921)
 Your Brother's Wife (1921)
 Your Bad Reputation (1922)
 La Boheme (1923)
 The Red Rider (1923)
 Maud Rockefeller's Bet (1924)
 The Doomed (1924)
 Set Me Free (1924)
 Za La Mort (1924)
 The Proud Silence (1925)
 Hedda Gabler (1925)
 Lena Warnstetten (1925)
 Battle of the Butterflies (1924)

Actor

 The Catwalk (1927) - Landrat von Krotkeim
 The Old Fritz (1928) - Lordmarschall Keith
 Luther (1928)
 Fair Game (1928) - Regisseur Finke
 Robert and Bertram (1928) - 2. Vagabund
 Die von der Scholle sind (1928)
 The Lord of the Tax Office (1929) - Udo von Langwitzs Vater
 Andreas Hofer (1929) - Pater Haspinger
 The Way Through the Night (1929)
 Marriage in Name Only (1930)
 Wibbel the Tailor (1931) - Nachtwächter
 M (1931) - Minister
 The Trunks of Mr. O.F. (1931) - Gesangslehrer
 The Eleven Schill Officers (1932)
 Unheimliche Geschichten (1932) - Kreisel in der Irrenanstalt
 The Black Hussar (1932) - Der Spion
 The First Right of the Child (1932)
 The Lake Calls (1933) - Der alte Jansen
 The Testament of Dr. Mabuse (1933)
 Music in the Blood (1934)
 Love and the First Railway (1934)
 The Two Seals (1934) - Dr.Spärlich
 The Gypsy Baron (1935)
 The Bird Seller (1935)
 A Pair of Lovers (1935)
 The Girl from the Marsh Croft (1935) - Vater Christmann
 Frisians in Peril (1935) - Christian Kröger
 Pillars of Society (1935) - Ein Bürger
 Augustus the Strong (1936) - Superintendent
 Soldaten - Kameraden (1936)
 Das schöne Fräulein Schragg (1937) - Schreiber
 Madame Bovary (1937) - Herzog de Laverrière
 To New Shores (1937) - Puritaner
 La Habanera (1937) - Falk
 Der nackte Spatz (1938) - Engel - Schneidermeister
 Spaßvögel (1939) - Kimpel
 Salonwagen E 417 (1939)
 Detours to Happiness (1939) - Dr. Lehmann
 Die Geliebte (1939)
 The Life and Loves of Tschaikovsky (1939) - Dr. Ossorgin (uncredited)
 Robert Koch (1939) - Wissenschaftler im Pathologischen Institu
 Kornblumenblau (1939)
 Ein ganzer Kerl (1939) - Versicherungsbeamter
 My Aunt, Your Aunt (1939)
 Rheinische Brautfahrt (1939) - Hausknecht August
 The Girl at the Reception (1940) - Hauptschriftleiter Grimm
 Clothes Make the Man (1940)
 Frieder und Catherlieschen (1940)
 The Swedish Nightingale (1941) - Hofuhrmacher
 Rembrandt (1942) - Stadtschreiber
 Der große Schatten (1942) - Zeitungsredakteur
 Münchhausen (1943) - Leibjäger Rösemeyer (uncredited)
 Paracelsus (1943) - Doctor
 Die Zaubergeige (1944)
 Shiva und die Galgenblume (1945)
 The Adventures of Fridolin (1948) - Der Standesbeamte
 Knall and Fall as Detectives (1953) - Professor Brott
 The Star of Rio (1955) - (final film role)

References

Bibliography
 Rolf Giesen. Nazi Propaganda Films: A History and Filmography. McFarland, 2003.

External links

1880 births
1958 deaths
German male film actors
German cinematographers
Film people from Cologne
Recipients of the Cross of the Order of Merit of the Federal Republic of Germany